The 2018 Liga 3 Bengkulu is a qualifying round for the national round of 2018 Liga 3. PS Benteng Central Bengkulu, the winner of the 2017 Liga 3 Bengkulu are the defending champions. The competition will begin on June 30, 2018.

Format 
In this competition, all teams will face each other in home and away match. The winner will represent Bengkulu in national round of 2018 Liga 3.

Teams
There are initially 11 clubs which will participate the league in this season.

Table
This stage scheduled starts on 29 April 2018.

References 

Bengkulu
Liga 3 (Indonesia)
2018 in Indonesian football
Seasons in Asian third tier association football leagues